Cootamundra, nicknamed Coota, is a town in the South West Slopes region of New South Wales, Australia and within the Riverina. It is within the Cootamundra-Gundagai Regional Council.  At the 2016 Census, Cootamundra had a population of 6,782. It is located on the Olympic Highway at the point where it crosses the Muttama Creek, between Junee and Cowra. Its railway station is on the Main Southern line, part of the Melbourne-to-Sydney line. 

Cootamundra is the birthplace of Sir Donald Bradman , an Australian cricketer universally regarded as the greatest batsman of all time. It is also known for being the site of Cootamundra Domestic Training Home for Aboriginal Girls, an institution housing Aboriginal girls who were forcibly taken from their families.

It is also the home of the Cootamundra wattle.  Every year there is a large "Wattle Time" Festival held at the time the wattle starts to bloom, with an art show and festivities.

History
The traditional owners of the area where present day Cootamundra exists are considered to be the Wiradjuri people, with the name "Cootamundra" probably deriving from the Wiradjuri language word guudhamang for "turtle".

Cootamundra was incorporated as a township on 9 August 1861, and the first settlers bought their lots in early 1862. Like many other towns in the Riverina, it was originally populated by those attracted by the gold rush of the 1860s but became a quiet yet prosperous agricultural community after the local deposits were exhausted. However, the potential sale of a recently disused mine near Adelong may have piqued the curiosity of would-be prospectors. 

It is considered one of the oldest towns in Australia List of towns and cities in Australia by year of settlement.

The town's rugby league team, the Cootamundra Bulldogs, competed in the Maher Cup.

Timeline 
 1847 – Cootamundra Run, a large stock run, is the first colonist settlement in the area.
 1861 – The site of Cootamundra is published in the NSW Government Gazette
 1862 – Gold mining commences at the nearby 'Muttama Reef' mine.
 1864 – The first church (Anglican) and post office are established
 1874 — Convent for the Presentation Order of nuns opened by (Catholic) Bishop of Goulburn 
 1875 – The first school in the district opens. 
 1877 – Cootamundra's railway connection opens on 1 November.
 1878 – Christ Church (Anglican) of England opens
 1879 – St Columba's (Catholic) church opens
 1884 – Cootamundra is gazetted as a municipality.
 1885 — Salt Clay Creek railway disaster - seven killed and dozens injured when culvert collapsed
 1896 – Cootamundra Cycling Club. It is probably the oldest continual club in NSW, although as was the case with most clubs it went into recess during the war years.
 1911–1968 – Cootamundra Domestic Training Home for Aboriginal Girls forcibly taken from their families.
 1912–1974 – The former Cootamundra Hospital and Cootamundra Aboriginal Girls' Training Home were built upon a hill north east of Cootamundra. The property consists of a large parcel of land which had room for buildings as well as orchards and livestock such as dairy cows. 
 1942 – On 3 December, the corvette , named for the town, is launched.
 1951 – Cootamundra Jazz Band is formed by John Ansell
 1952 – Name of Cootamundry officially changed to Cootamundra.
 1955 – The first Cootamundra Annual Classic cycling handicap race, one of the oldest open races in NSW.
 1956 – Cootamundra's rugby league football club's Bill Marsh is first selected to play for the Australian national team.
 1960 – Cootamundra Blues Australian rules football club is established.
 1982 – In November 1982, the aviation company Masling Industries is formed.  This was restructured in June 1993 after the death of its owner.
 1986 – Popular Australian singer/songwriter/bush poet John R Williamson released his song 'Cootamundra Wattle'.
 1908 – Donald Bradman (later Sir Donald) is born in Cootamundra.
 1998 – Phase 1 of Cricket Captains' Walk declared open; all busts the work of Harden–Murrumburrah sculptor Carl Valerius
 2000 – The first annual beach volleyball competition. Truckloads of sand are deposited in a main street for "Coota Beach" (punning reference to Kuta Beach in Bali, Indonesia).
 2015 – Australian youth radio station Triple J featured the 'Cootamundra bonus weather rap'.

Churches
The first churches in Cootamundra were:
Primitive Methodist
Rev. Smith was minister from around 1874, succeeded by J. Spalding, who was minister in 1877, and services were held on alternate Sunday afternoons.
Wesleyan Methodist
The church, seating 100 persons, was opened on 17 December 1876. Rev. G. Thompson was minister in 1878 and services were held regularly. In 1880 Rev. R. East was the only minister resident in the town.
Anglican
Christ Church opened on 12 July 1878; the vicar W. Cocks shared with Murrumburrah. In January 1880 Rev. S. B. Holt left Gundagai to take up the position.
Roman Catholic
Eighty confirmations were performed in 1875 in conjunction with a jubilee attended by Bishop Lanigan of Goulburn and Fathers Bermingham (Burrowa), Dunne and O'Dwyer (Gundagai), and Hanley (Goulburn). 
Mass was held fortnightly in the schoolroom by visiting priests from Gundagai.
St Columba's church was consecrated on 30 November 1879.
The first resident pastor was Rev. Richard Butler in 1881.

Military history
During World War II, Cootamundra was the location of RAAF No.3 Inland Aircraft Fuel Depot (IAFD), completed in 1942 and closed on 14 June 1944. It was located in an area of land near the intersection of Olympic Highway and Thompson Street. Usually consisting of 4 tanks, 31 fuel depots were built across Australia for the storage and supply of aircraft fuel for the RAAF and the US Army Air Forces at a total cost of £900,000 ($1,800,000).

It was also home to the No 1 Air Observers School, commemorated by a plaque at Cootamundra Airfield.

A plane from the No. 31 Beaufighter Squadron, RAAF, from Wagga Wagga, crashed nearby on 21 September 1942 during training exercises, resulting in the death of Flt/Sgt J. E. Jenkins and Sgt V. Sutherst. A memorial alongside the main road to Young, dedicated on 28 April 1990, is regularly tended. See Gallery below.

Heritage listings

Cootamundra has a number of heritage-listed sites, including:
 Cootamundra-Griffith railway: Cootamundra West railway station
 Main Southern railway: Cootamundra railway station
 39 Rinkin Street: Cootamundra Domestic Training Home for Aboriginal Girls
 219 Sutton Street: Cootamundra World War II Fuel Depot

Description and attractions
Cootamundra is located in the South West Slopes region of New South Wales, within the Riverina region.

It is within the local government area of Cootamundra-Gundagai Regional Council. Abb McAlister was elected mayor of the newly-formed Cootamundra-Gundagai Regional Council on 21 September 2017.

The town is known as the birthplace of the great cricketer Sir Donald Bradman. Although he never lived in the town and his parents left Yeo Yeo (some 18km from Cootamundra) when he was two, the town celebrates this connection with the Sir Donald Bradman Birthplace Museum, the home where "The Don" was born, a fully restored visitors' site featuring cricketing memorabilia and artefacts.

The Coota Ex-Services Club is an ex-servicemen's club that is open to the public as a restaurant. 

Hemet, California, is a sister city.

Cricket Captains' Walk

In 1998 a collection of 14 captains of the Australia International Test XI cricket team was unveiled in Jubilee Park, adjacent the Caravan Park. Specially commissioned, they were all the work of Harden-Murrumburrah sculptor Carl Valerius.

In 2008 a further 30 busts were installed on either side of a looping path, making a full set of Australian Test cricket captains, with three more added in 2020 to bring the list up to date. These are by various artists from the Tom Bass sculpture studio. The all-weather path, which starts and ends at Wallendoon Street is family, jogger, and wheelchair friendly, and approximately 250 metres long.

A life-sized bronze statue of Bradman in action, also by Valerius, is nearby, as is a newly-installed barbecue and playground. Jubilee Park, the site of these attractions, is on land reclaimed from the original stock dam, memorialised by a plaque on the Morgan Arch on Wallendoon Street.

The Giant

The large effigy of a fairytale giant gesturing towards to his crotch was created by an unknown artist around 1975 in fibreglass as a mascot for "The Giant Supermarket" on the corner of Cooper and Wallendoon streets. 
This location was in 1882 the site of Kibby's "Trade Palace" department store; and taken over by Solomon Cohen (c. 1848–1922) in 1886. In 1943 it became "Cohen's Corner", a name which endures to this day. "Hammond and Hanlon" were tenants in 1962 and "The Giant" in 1975, subsequently "U-Mark-it", "Half-case Warehouse", "Payless", and "Food World". It next became Mark Ward's hardware store, then "GV Bargains".
When the statue was taken down it was purchased by Allan and Phuong Jenkins, who ran a florist shop nearby. In 1985 Allan participated in a Round-Australia marathon run by Rotary International and the Australian Cancer Society as a fundraiser, and his support vehicle was surmounted by "The Giant". In 2014 the Jenkins couple donated the statue to the Cootamundra Heritage Centre.

Local artist Jim Newman did its original paintwork back in 1975, and his brother Robert Newman was responsible for its restoration in 2015. The statue is located alongside the Heritage Centre on Hovell Street, near the railway station.

Population
According to the 2016 Australian census, there were 6,782 people in Cootamundra. Of these:
 Aboriginal and Torres Strait Islander people made up 5.6% of the population. 
 85.6% of people were born in Australia. The next most common country of birth was England at 2.1%.
 91.6% of people spoke only English at home. 
 The most common responses for religion were Catholic 30.8%, Anglican 28.4% and No Religion 16.4%.

Transport

Cootamundra railway station is located on the Main Southern railway line, with passengers served in each direction by twice daily NSW TrainLink XPT railway services between Sydney and Melbourne, and the weekly Xplorer railway services to Griffith. Interstate freight trains also pass through the town.

Regional Rail Logistics previously operated a containerised freight service from Junee to Sydney stopping in the town,

TrainLink coaches
Cootamundra acts as a hub for coach services, run by Transport for NSW, to other regional centres with departures and arrivals timed to connect with certain New South Wales XPT train arrivals. The exception is Services 704/703 (coloured row), provided for those who have business in Canberra civic, the major hospitals, or to connect with the Canberra–Sydney rail service (three trains per day both directions).

Seats are allocated and must be booked ahead. must be consulted for conditions of travel and coach stop locations. On-line booking and more information

Airport
Cootamundra Airport, is one of the oldest country airports outside of Mascot to be continually licensed.

From 1991 to 2002 local business Country Connection Airlines offered regional flights from Cootamundra to Sydney, as well as to many other regional locations such as West Wyalong, Cowra, Forbes and Young.

Sport
Cootamundra has a long and proud sporting history, with the region most notably producing Sir Donald Bradman, the greatest test cricketer ever.

Today, the most popular sport in Cootamundra is rugby league. The local team, the Cootamundra Bulldogs, compete in the George Tooke Shield competition, which is part of the broader Canberra Rugby League. The club formerly competed in the Group 9 Rugby League competition, in which they were among the most successful clubs, winning nine titles, and their junior sides remain in this league. The club famously produced Les Boyd, whom the club's home ground is named after, Eric Weissel, and Paul Field, a local player who was picked to represent New South Wales in the 1983 State of Origin series, one of only three players to ever be selected for the side from a Country Rugby League club.

Cootamundra also has an Australian rules football side, nicknamed the Blues, who play in the AFL Canberra lower divisions. The region also has a strong local cricket competition.

Notable residents
 Paul Beath (born 1968)- represented the Canberra Raiders and Manly Sea Eagles in the NRL
 Les Boyd (born 17 November 1956) grew up representing the Cootamundra Bulldogs in the Group 9 Rugby League, became a professional Rugby League Player, representing Australia and NSW in the State of Origin.
 Thomas Bradley (born 1990) - Australian dancer for Sydney Dance Company and Australian Dance Theatre
 Sir Donald Bradman  (27 August 1908 – 25 February 2001), Australian international cricketer, born in Cootamundra
 Bob Holder, rodeo champion
 Philip Lowe (born 1961) - Governor of the Reserve Bank of Australia, moved to Cootamundra aged 5.
 Hayley Manwaring (born 1991) - Guitarist in Australian rock band Moaning Lisa (band)
 Billy Murdoch (1854–1911), batsman and Test cricket captain, was a solicitor in private life, and had a practice in Cootamundra in the 1880s.
 Hubert Leslie Primrose (1880–1942) solicitor and politician
 Isaac Smith (30 December 1988) - AFL footballer
 Ethelbert Ambrook Southee (1890–1968) college principal
 Eric Weissel (1903–1972) - professional Rugby League Player

Climate

Cootamundra has a typical climate of the lower South West Slopes region; long, hot, dry summers interspersed with severe thunderstorms, and cool winters with many rain days. Occasionally, snow may fall during the winter months, with the most recent settled snowfall having occurred in August 2019. Under the Köppen climate classification scheme, the town has a humid subtropical climate (Cfa), receiving enough precipitation to avoid the semi-arid (BSk) climate classification.

In popular culture
 In The Two Ronnies' sketch "The Australians", Cootamundra is the location of their travel agency.
 Leonard Hubbard recorded the song "Cootamundra" in 1924.
 The Cootamundra Jazz Band (1951–1960) was one of Australia's foremost Dixieland groups
 John Williamson recorded the song "Cootamundra Wattle" in 1986.

Gallery

References

External links

 Cootamundra-Gundagai Regional Council
 Cootamundra – New Country Living

 
Towns in the Riverina
Towns in New South Wales
Cootamundra-Gundagai Regional Council
Mining towns in New South Wales